The  is an archaeological site with the ruins of a Nara to Heian period regional administrative complex, located in what is now the Tenra neighborhood of the city of Ōta, Gunma Prefecture in the northern Kantō region of Japan. The site was designated a National Historic Site of Japan in 2008.

Overview
Each of the units had an administrative complex built on a semi-standardized layout based on contemporary Chinese design.

The Niita District Gunchō site was discovered in 2007 in conjunction with land development for a new housing district. On archaeological excavation, the foundations for a regional government administrative complex on an unprecedented scale was discovered. The site contained the foundations of 90-meter long buildings forming a square, with a large building with dimensions of 50 meters square in the middle. The remains of a number of granaries for storing tax rice was later discovered in the northwestern part of the ruins in 2015. In addition, In addition, traces of a trapezoidal moat with dimensions of 400 meters east–west by 300 meters north–south were found surrounding the complex. The ruins date from the late 7th century to the early 9th century.

The site was backfilled after excavation and is now an empty field with a monument and explanatory plaque. It is about a 20-minute walk from Jiroenbashi Station on the Tōbu Kiryū Line.

See also
List of Historic Sites of Japan (Gunma)

References

External links
Ōta City official site 

History of Gunma Prefecture
Ōta, Gunma
Archaeological sites in Japan
Historic Sites of Japan